Mohamed Gouda  (born 15 August 1979) is a former Egyptian footballer.

Club career
Gouda had a spell with Ankaragücü in the Turkish Super Lig.

International career
Gouda has made 10 appearances for the senior Egypt national football team.

References

External links

1979 births
Living people
Egyptian footballers
Egypt international footballers
Al Ahly SC players
FC Aarau players
MKE Ankaragücü footballers
Al Masry SC players
Egyptian Premier League players
Association football midfielders